Ben Wells (born 29 February 2000) is an English professional footballer who plays for Crawley Town, as a defender.

Career
Wells played youth football for West Ham United and Queens Park Rangers, and in non-league for Concord Rangers and Welling United, before signing a one-year contact with Crawley Town in July 2022 following a trial.

References

2000 births
Living people
English footballers
West Ham United F.C. players
Queens Park Rangers F.C. players
Concord Rangers F.C. players
Welling United F.C. players
Crawley Town F.C. players
Association football defenders
English Football League players
National League (English football) players